Louis Binks (23 October 1898 – 1969) was an English professional footballer who played as a full-back.

References

1898 births
1969 deaths
Footballers from Sheffield
English footballers
Association football fullbacks
Tinsley Amateurs F.C. players
Coventry City F.C. players
Grimsby Town F.C. players
Rotherham Town F.C. (1899) players
English Football League players